Prehistoric Autopsy is a 2012 British television documentary film series shown in three one-hour episodes on BBC Two. The series is about human evolution and is narrated by biologist George McGavin and anatomist Alice Roberts. Graeme Thomson is the series producer and Jane Aldous is the executive producer.

Episodes

Participants
The documentary film series is narrated by George McGavin and Alice Roberts and includes the following participants (alphabetized by last name):

 Zeresenay Alemseged (California Academy of Sciences)
 Anna Barney (University of Southampton)
 Barbara Boucher (Queen Mary University of London)
 Bruce Bradley (Exeter University)
 Rachel Carmody (evolutionary biologist)
 Paul Constantino (Marshall University)
 Robin Crompton (University of Liverpool)
 Viktor Deak (paleoartist)
 Marco de la Rasilla
 Peter de Menocal (Columbia University)
 Jez Harris
 John D. Hawks (University of Wisconsin)
 Donald Carl Johanson
 David Lordkipanidze (Georgian National Museum)
 Gabriele Macho (Powell-Cotton Museum)
 Sandra Martelli (University College London)
 George McGavin (narrator and biologist)
 Jerome Micheletta (University of Portsmouth)
 Alice Roberts (narrator and anatomist)
 Antonio Rosas Gonzalez
 Karen Rosenberg (University of Delaware)
 Danielle Schreve (Royal Holloway, University of London)
 Michael Schultz (University of Göttingen)
 Colin Shaw (University of Cambridge)
 Scott Simpson (Case Western Reserve University)
 Anne Skinner (Williams College)
 Tanya Smith (Harvard University)
 Paul Tafforeau (European Synchrotron Radiation Facility)
 Bridget Waller (University of Portsmouth)
 Carol Ward (University of Missouri)
 Peter Wheeler (Liverpool John Moores University)
 Joao Zilhao (University of Barcelona)

See also 

 Dawn of Humanity (2015 PBS documentary film)
 Origins of Us (2011 BBC documentary film)
 The Incredible Human Journey (2009 BBC documentary film)

References

External links 
 
 Prehistoric Autopsy at DocuWiki.net
 
 Prehistoric Autopsy at Amazon.com
 Prehistoric Autopsy – video search on Dailymotion
 Prehistoric Autopsy – video search on YouTube
 
 Human Timeline (Interactive) – Smithsonian, National Museum of Natural History (August 2016)

2012 British television series debuts
2012 British television series endings
2010s British documentary television series
2010s British television miniseries
BBC high definition shows
BBC television miniseries
English-language television shows
Documentary films about prehistoric life
BBC television documentaries about prehistoric and ancient history
Documentary television shows about evolution